Angelique Kerber was the defending champion, but she lost to Carla Suárez Navarro in the quarterfinals.

Madison Keys won the title, defeating Barbora Strýcová in the final, 6–3, 6–4.

Seeds

Draw

Finals

Top half

Bottom half

Qualifying

Seeds

Qualifiers

Lucky losers
  Magda Linette

Draw

First qualifier

Second qualifier

Third qualifier

Fourth qualifier

References
 Main Draw
 Qualifying Draw

Aegon Classicandnbsp;- Singles
Singles